St. Timothy's Protestant Episcopal Church is a historic church at 226 SE. 3rd Street in Massillon, Ohio.

It was built in 1892 and added to the National Register in 1979.

References

Churches completed in 1892
Episcopal churches in Ohio
Churches on the National Register of Historic Places in Ohio
Gothic Revival church buildings in Ohio
Churches in Stark County, Ohio
National Register of Historic Places in Stark County, Ohio
Churches in Massillon, Ohio
19th-century Episcopal church buildings